Bhaupur may refer to:

 Bhaupur, Kanpur
 Bhaupur, Ambedkar Nagar